Melanella polita is a species of small sea snail, a marine gastropod mollusk in the family Eulimidae. It was formerly assigned to the genus Eulima. This species was one of the first to be assigned to the major genus Melanella of Eulimidae.

Distribution
This species occurs in the North Atlantic Ocean and in the Mediterranean Sea (off Greece).

References

 Gofas, S.; Le Renard, J.; Bouchet, P. (2001). Mollusca, in: Costello, M.J. et al. (Ed.) (2001). European register of marine species: a check-list of the marine species in Europe and a bibliography of guides to their identification. Collection Patrimoines Naturels, 50: pp. 180–213

External links
 To World Register of Marine Species

polita
Gastropods described in 1758
Taxa named by Carl Linnaeus